Karolina Zalewska-Gardoni (born 19 March 1984) is a Polish handball player for Paris 92 and the Polish national team.

References

1984 births
Living people
Polish female handball players
Sportspeople from Warsaw
Expatriate handball players
Polish expatriates in France
21st-century Polish women